Logone Occidental may refer to:
 Logone Occidental Prefecture
 Logone Occidental Region